William Bain Scarth (November 10, 1837 – May 15, 1902) was a Scottish-born businessman and political figure in Ontario and Manitoba, Canada. He represented Winnipeg in the House of Commons of Canada from 1887 to 1891 as a Conservative member.

He was born in Aberdeen, the son of James Lendrum Scarth and Jane Geddes, was educated in Edinburgh and Aberdeen, and came to Upper Canada in 1855. Scarth campaigned for Isaac Buchanan in Hamilton and then Adam Hope in London and then Toronto, also working as manager of the Toronto branch of Hope's hardware company. In 1869, he married Jessie Stuart Franklin Hamilton. He entered business on his own as a timber merchant and shipowner in 1871. He was also involved in real estate, mining and railways, and managed capital invested in Canada on behalf of British investors. Scarth served as a member of Toronto city council in 1879 and 1882. He was an unsuccessful candidate for a seat in the Manitoba assembly in 1886. In 1882, he became managing director of the Canada North-West Land Company, which had purchased land grants in Manitoba formerly owned by the Canadian Pacific Railway; the CNWLC lobbied for his retirement from politics and Scarth was forced to support Hugh John Macdonald as federal candidate in 1891. He became federal deputy minister of agriculture in 1895. Scarth died in Ottawa at the age of 64.

References 

Toronto city councillors
People from Aberdeen
Members of the House of Commons of Canada from Manitoba
Conservative Party of Canada (1867–1942) MPs
19th-century Canadian civil servants
1837 births
1902 deaths